Kur Kahriz (also Romanized as Kūr Kahrīz and Kūr-e Kahrīz; also known as Gūr-e Kahrīz, Kūr-e Kārīz, and Kūrkārīz) is a village in Gonbad Rural District, in the Central District of Hamadan County, Hamadan Province, Iran. At the 2006 census, its population was 443, in 96 families.

References 

Populated places in Hamadan County